Ananda Pyissi (also spelled Anantapyissi;  1240 – 1 July 1287) was a chief minister in the service of King Narathihapate of the Pagan Dynasty of Burma (Myanmar). He was also the commander-in-chief of the Royal Burmese Army, and fought unsuccessfully against the first two Mongol invasions of Burma (1277–85). He led the initial ceasefire negotiations with the Mongols (1285–86). He reportedly was killed alongside the king in 1287 by Thihathu of Prome.

Early life
He was born c. 1240 to a senior official family in Pagan (Bagan). His father was Yazathingyan, then a minister (အမတ်) at the Pagan court, and his mother may have been Saw Khin Htut, a daughter of King Kyaswa of Pagan. He was the eldest son, and had three siblings: Yanda Pyissi, Saw San and Saw Soe. His personal name was originally Ot-Hla (အုတ်လှ); he later became known as Ot-Hla-Gyi (အုတ်လှကြီး) after his younger brother Ot-Hla-Nge (အုတ်လှငယ်) was born. The family grew up in Pagan where his father eventually rose to be the chief minister by 1248.

Career

Early royal service
He and his younger brother both followed his father's footsteps, and by the late 1250s had entered the royal service. In 1259–60, both brothers accompanied their father, then commander-in-chief, on the second Missagiri campaign (in present-day Rakhine State). The campaign ended Missagiri's two-year-old rebellion but their father died on the return trip. Both brothers both vied to succeed their father's title Yazathingyan. The king refused but allowed them to serve at his court with the titles of Ananda Pyissi and Yanda Pyissi, respectively.

Chief minister
Ananda Pyissi rose to be a minister, by perhaps as early as 1261, and eventually the chief minister by 1271. In the late Pagan period, the chief minister was the first among four or five ministers of the court, and had the responsibility to command the armed forces as well. As chief minister, Ananda Pyissi spent much of the 1270s trying to keep his kingdom out of the advancing grasp of the Mongol Empire. In 1271, the Mongols, who first captured the neighboring state to the northeast of Pagan in 1253, demanded nominal tribute. Aware of the gravity of the situation, Ananda Pyissi advised the king to use diplomacy, and avoid war. But there was little room to maneuver. Not only did the king refuse to submit, but he sent an army to reconquer the Wa and Palaung regions at the border that had gone over to the Mongols. The Yunnan government sent another embassy on 3 March 1273 to Pagan, again demanding tribute. Ananda Pyissi's court tried to stall the Mongol embassy. But the king again refused, and according to the chronicles, he ordered the diplomats executed over the objections of Ananda Pyissi. At any rate, in 1275, the Yunnan government recommended war to the emperor. The emperor agreed.

Commander-in-chief

By then, the Burmese government too had expected war. In early 1277, Ananda Pyissi and Yanda Pyissi led the Royal Burmese Army, and marched to the border. In April, they met the Mongol invasion force—which consisted mostly of Turkic-speaking battalions—at the border, in present-day Yunnan. In the ensuing battle of Ngasaunggyan, the larger Burmese army was defeated by the smaller, more mobile Mongol army. The battle was witnessed and reported by Marco Polo, and a 1278 inscription at Pagan corroborates the army's defeat at Ngasaunggyan.

Despite the military success, the Yunnan government could not establish its rule of the borderlands in the following years, and Pagan did not give up its claim on them. In September 1283, the Mongol government decided to impose tighter control by establishing a province, made up of the borderlands and northern Burma (present-day southwestern Yunnan and Kachin State). The Mongols sent in another army. Ananda Pyissi and Yanda Pyissi again led the Burmese army. The two armies again met at Ngasaunggyan on 3 December 1283. The Burmese were again defeated. The Mongols chased the retreating Burmese armies and defeated them at Kaungsin on 9 December 1283. Ananda Pyissi and the army fell back to Tagaung but could not defend it. Tagaung fell in January 1284. The Mongols pressed on down to the Irrawaddy valley, and perhaps threatened as far south as Pagan by January 1285. After the dust settled, the Mongols had gained up to Tagaung, and established a Mongol province with a garrison at Tagaung. The Burmese king finally sent Ananda Pyissi and Maha Bo to negotiate. The initial ceasefire negotiations were successful insofar as maintaining the line of control as well as setting the stage for further negotiations for a permanent agreement, which were to take place in Beijing.

The 1285 peace negotiations, recorded in a contemporary inscription, were the last known Burmese record of Ananda Pyissi. Chronicles incorrectly say that he was killed in action during the second Mongol invasion in early 1284 by an arrow shot. According to Chinese records, the Yunnan prince re-appointed someone by the name of Ananda as the Burmese king's senior official (presumably as chief minister), and that Ananda was killed alongside the king when the king was assassinated.

Notes

References

Bibliography
 
 
 
 
 
 
 
 
 
 

Burmese generals
13th-century Burmese people
1287 deaths
Ministers of Pagan dynasty